Flashfire is a 1993 American action crime thriller film directed by Elliot Silverstein and Billy Zane and Louis Gossett Jr.

Cast
Billy Zane as Jack Flinder
Louis Gossett Jr. as Ben Durand
Kristin Minter as Lisa Cates
Louis Giambalvo as Al Sherwin
Tom Mason as Art Cantrell
Gregory Millar as Paulie
Ric Drasin as Kraus von Zeck
Caroline Williams as Ann
Mimi Kennedy as Kate Cantrell
Arthur Hansel as Ralph Flinder

Production
The film was shot in Los Angeles.

Release
The film was released direct-to-video in 1995.

Reception
TV Guide gave the film a negative review: "Although it adequately sets up its complicated (if cliched) storyline, it falls apart in the last reel, particularly in Gossett's vaguely motivated switch to a bad guy (it has something to do with him losing his life savings in one of the burned buildings)."

David Parkinson of Radio Times awarded the film two stars out of five and wrote, "Carelessly directed by Elliot Silverstein (whose previous work includes Cat Ballou and A Man Called Horse), this muddled tale of corruption and conspiracy comes to an abrupt and highly unsatisfactory conclusion."

References

External links
 
 

Films directed by Elliot Silverstein
Films shot in Los Angeles
1990s English-language films